Jamuna Group is one of the largest Bangladeshi industrial conglomerates. It operates in a range of industry sectors, including Textiles, Chemicals, Leather, motor cycles, Consumer products, Media and Advertisement.

The Jamuna Group was established in the 1970s by Nurul Islam Babul, who was an architect by training. Best known for founding the Jamuna Group and building the Jamuna Future Park, Babul was also the owner of the Bangla daily Jugantor and the television channel Jamuna TV.

The Jamuna group has lately taken to philanthropy by setting up a non-profit organization (NPO) to alleviate the condition of Rohingya refugees in Bangladesh. The group has donated  ($5,000,000) to the NPO.

List of companies 
 Business Enterprise
 Jugantor, a national daily newspaper
 Jamuna Future Park, the largest shopping mall in the Bangladesh.
 Jamuna TV
 JW Marriott Hotels (Bangladesh)
 Crown Beverage 
 Jamuna Knitting & Dyeing Ltd.
 Jamuna Denims Ltd.
 Jamuna Spinning Mills Ltd.
 Shameem Spinning Mills Ltd.
 Shameem Composite Mills Ltd.
 Shameem Rotor Spinning Ltd.
 Jamuna City
 New Uttara Model Town
 Pegasus Leathers Ltd.
 Jamuna Distillery Ltd.
 Jamuna Welding Electrode Ltd.
 Jamuna Electronics & Automobiles.
 Jamuna Tyre
 Jamuna Paper
 Jamuna PVC Pipe
 Jamuna Motorcycles
 Jamuna Rubber and Tyre
 Jamuna Paper 
 Jamuna Poly Silk
 Hoorain HTF
 Wholesale Club Ltd

See also
 List of companies of Bangladesh

References

External links
 

 
Conglomerate companies established in 1974
Conglomerate companies of Bangladesh
1974 establishments in Bangladesh